Juan Ignacio Ramírez Polero (born 1 February 1997) is a Uruguayan professional footballer who plays as a forward for Nacional.

Club career
A youth academy graduate of Liverpool Montevideo, Ramírez made his senior team debut on 21 February 2016 in a 3–1 league defeat against Juventud. He scored his first goal on 12 March 2017 in a 3–1 league defeat against Boston River.

On 31 August 2021, Ramírez joined French club Saint-Étienne on a season long loan deal.

International career
Ramírez is a former Uruguay youth international. He was part of Uruguay squad which reached semi-finals at 2019 Pan American Games. On 29 December 2019, Uruguay under-23 team head coach Gustavo Ferreyra named Ramírez in 23-man final squad for 2020 CONMEBOL Pre-Olympic Tournament.

In May 2021, Ramírez received maiden call-up to senior team for FIFA World Cup qualifying matches against Paraguay and Venezuela.

Personal life
Ramírez is elder brother of fellow footballer Santiago Ramírez.

Career statistics

Honours
Nacional
Uruguayan Primera División: 2022

Individual
 Uruguayan Primera División Team of the Year: 2019, 2020

References

External links

1997 births
Living people
Uruguayan footballers
Uruguayan expatriate footballers
Association football forwards
Liverpool F.C. (Montevideo) players
AS Saint-Étienne players
Club Nacional de Football players
Uruguayan Primera División players
Ligue 1 players
Expatriate footballers in France
Uruguayan expatriate sportspeople in France